Neferneferuaten Nefertiti ( – c. 1330 BC) was a queen of the 18th Dynasty of Ancient Egypt, the great royal wife of Pharaoh Akhenaten. Nefertiti and her husband were known for their radical overhaul of state religious policy, in which they promoted the earliest known form of monotheism, Atenism, centered around the sun disc and its direct connection to the royal household. With her husband, she reigned at what was arguably the wealthiest period of ancient Egyptian history. Some scholars believe that Nefertiti ruled briefly as Neferneferuaten after her husband's death and before the ascension of Tutankhamun, although this identification is a matter of ongoing debate. If Nefertiti did rule as Pharaoh, her reign was marked by the fall of Amarna and relocation of the capital back to the traditional city of Thebes.

She was made famous by her bust, now in Berlin's Neues Museum. The bust is one of the most copied works of art of ancient Egypt. It was attributed to the sculptor Thutmose, and it was found in his workshop.

Names and titles 
Nefertiti had many titles including: 
 Hereditary Princess (iryt-p`t)
 Great of Praises (wrt-Hzwt)
 Lady of Grace (nebet-imat, nbt-jmꜣt)
 Sweet of Love (beneret-merut, bnrt-mrwt)
 Lady of The Two Lands (nebet-tawi, nbt-tꜣwj)
 Main King's Wife, his beloved (hemet-nesut-aat meretef, ḥmt-nswt-ꜥꜣt mrt.f)
 Great King's Wife, his beloved (hemet-nesut-weret meretef, ḥmt-nswt-wrt mrt.f)
 Lady of All Women (henut-hemut-nebut, ḥnwt-ḥmwt-nbwt)
 Mistress of Upper & Lower Egypt (henut-shemau-mehu, ḥnwt-šmꜣw-mḥw).

While modern Egyptological pronunciation renders her name as Nefertiti, her name was the sentence nfr.t jj.tj “the beautiful one has come” and probably contemporarily pronounced Naftita from older Nafrat-ita or perhaps Nafert-yiti. Nefertiti's name, Egyptian Nfr.t-jy.tj, can be translated as "The Beautiful Woman has Come".

Family and early life
Almost nothing is known about Nefertiti's life prior to her marriage to Akhenaten. Scenes from the tombs of the nobles in Amarna mention that Nefertiti had a sister, named Mutbenret. Further, a woman named Tey carried the title of "Nurse of the Great Royal Wife." In addition, Tey's husband Ay carried the title "God's Father." Some Egyptologists believe that this title was used for a man whose daughter married the pharaoh. Based on these titles, it has been proposed that Ay was in fact Nefertiti's father. However, neither Ay nor Tey are explicitly referred to as Nefertiti's parents in the existing sources. At the same time, no sources exist that directly contradict Ay's fatherhood which is considered likely due to the great influence he wielded during Nefertiti's life and after her death. According to another theory, Nefertiti was the daughter of Ay and a woman besides Tey, but Ay's first wife died before Nefertiti's rise to the position of queen, whereupon Ay married Tey, making her Nefertiti's stepmother. Nevertheless, this entire proposal is based on speculation and conjecture.

It has also been proposed that Nefertiti was Akhenaten's full sister, though this is contradicted by her titles which do not include the title of "King's Daughter" or "King's Sister," usually used to indicate a relative of a pharaoh. Another theory about her parentage that gained some support identified Nefertiti with the Mitanni princess Tadukhipa, partially based on Nefertiti's name ("The Beautiful Woman has Come") which has been interpreted by some scholars as signifying a foreign origin. However, Tadukhipa was already married to Akhenaten's father and there is no evidence for any reason why this woman would need to alter her name in a proposed marriage to Akhenaten, nor any hard evidence of a foreign non-Egyptian background for Nefertiti.

The exact dates when Nefertiti married Akhenaten and became the king's great royal wife are uncertain. They are known to have had at least six daughters together, including Meritaten, Meketaten, Ankhesenpaaten (later called Ankhesenamun when she married Tutankhamun), Neferneferuaten Tasherit, Neferneferure, and Setepenre. She was once considered as a candidate for the mother of Tutankhamun, however a genetic study conducted on discovered mummies suggests that she was not.

Life

Nefertiti first appears in scenes in Thebes. In the damaged tomb (TT188) of the royal butler Parennefer, the new king Amenhotep IV is accompanied by a royal woman, and this lady is thought to be an early depiction of Nefertiti. The king and queen are shown worshiping the Aten. In the tomb of the vizier Ramose, Nefertiti is shown standing behind Amenhotep IV in the Window of Appearance during the reward ceremony for the vizier.

During the early years in Thebes, Akhenaten (still known as Amenhotep IV) had several temples erected at Karnak. One of the structures, the Mansion of the Benben (hwt-ben-ben), was dedicated to Nefertiti. She is depicted with her daughter Meritaten and in some scenes the princess Meketaten participates as well. In scenes found on the talatat, Nefertiti appears almost twice as often as her husband. She is shown appearing behind her husband the pharaoh in offering scenes in the role of the queen supporting her husband, but she is also depicted in scenes that would have normally been the prerogative of the king. She is shown smiting the enemy, and captive enemies decorate her throne.

In the fourth year of his reign, Amenhotep IV decided to move the capital to Akhetaten (modern Amarna). In his fifth year, Amenhotep IV officially changed his name to Akhenaten, and Nefertiti was henceforth known as Neferneferuaten-Nefertiti. The name change was a sign of the ever-increasing importance of the cult of the Aten. It changed Egypt's religion from a polytheistic religion to a religion which may have been better described as a monolatry (the depiction of a single god as an object for worship) or henotheism (one god, who is not the only god).

The boundary stelae of years 4 and 5 mark the boundaries of the new city and suggest that the move to the new city of Akhetaten occurred around that time. The new city contained several large open-air temples dedicated to the Aten. Nefertiti and her family would have resided in the Great Royal Palace in the centre of the city and possibly at the Northern Palace as well. Nefertiti and the rest of the royal family feature prominently in the scenes at the palaces and in the tombs of the nobles.
Nefertiti's steward during this time was an official named Meryre II. He would have been in charge of running her household.
 
Inscriptions in the tombs of Huya and Meryre II dated to Year 12, 2nd month of Peret, Day 8 show a large foreign tribute. The people of Kharu (the north) and Kush (the south) are shown bringing gifts of gold and precious items to Akhenaten and Nefertiti. In the tomb of Meryre II, Nefertiti's steward, the royal couple is shown seated in a kiosk with their six daughters in attendance. This is one of the last times princess Meketaten is shown alive.

Two representations of Nefertiti that were excavated by Flinders Petrie appear to show Nefertiti in the middle to later part of Akhenaten's reign 'after the exaggerated style of the early years had relaxed somewhat'. One is a small piece on limestone and is a preliminary sketch of Nefertiti wearing her distinctive tall crown with carving began around the mouth, chin, ear and tab of the crown. Another is a small inlay head (Petrie Museum Number UC103) modeled from reddish-brown quartzite that was clearly intended to fit into a larger composition.

Meketaten may have died in year 13 or 14. Nefertiti, Akhenaten, and three princesses are shown mourning her. The last dated inscription naming her and Akhenaten comes from a building inscription in the limestone quarry at Dayr Abū Ḥinnis. It dates to year 16 of the king's reign and is also the last dated inscription naming the king.

Possible reign as Pharaoh 

Many scholars believe Nefertiti had a role elevated from that of great royal wife, and was promoted to co-regent by her husband Pharaoh Akhenaten before his death. She is depicted in many archaeological sites as equal in stature to a King, smiting Egypt's enemies, riding a chariot, and worshipping the Aten in the manner of a pharaoh. When Nefertiti's name disappears from historical records, it is replaced by that of a co-regent named Neferneferuaten, who became a female Pharaoh. It seems likely that Nefertiti, in a similar fashion to the previous female Pharaoh Hatshepsut, assumed the kingship under the name Pharaoh Neferneferuaten after her husband's death. It is also possible that, in a similar fashion to Hatshepsut, Nefertiti disguised herself as a male and assumed the male alter-ego of Smenkhkare; in this instance she could have elevated her daughter Meritaten to the role of great royal wife.

If Nefertiti did rule Egypt as Pharaoh, it has been theorized that she would have attempted damage control and may have re-instated the ancient Egyptian religion and the Amun priests, and had Tutankhamun raised in with the traditional gods.

Archaeologist and Egyptologist Dr. Zahi Hawass theorized that Nefertiti returned to Thebes from Amarna to rule as Pharaoh, based on ushabti and other feminine evidence of a female pharaoh found in Tutankhamun's tomb, as well as evidence of Nefertiti smiting Egypt's enemies which was a duty reserved to kings.

Death

Old theories

Pre-2012 Egyptological theories thought that Nefertiti vanished from the historical record around Year 12 of Akhenaten's reign, with no word of her thereafter. Conjectured causes included injury, a plague that was sweeping through the city, and a natural cause. This theory was based on the discovery of several ushabti fragments inscribed for Nefertiti (now located in the Louvre and the Brooklyn Museum).

A previous theory that she fell into disgrace was discredited when deliberate erasures of monuments belonging to a queen of Akhenaten were shown to refer to Kiya instead.

During Akhenaten's reign (and perhaps after), Nefertiti enjoyed unprecedented power. By the twelfth year of his reign, there is evidence she may have been elevated to the status of co-regent: equal in status to the pharaoh, as may be depicted on the Coregency Stela.

It is possible that Nefertiti is the ruler named Neferneferuaten. Some theorists believe that Nefertiti was still alive and held influence on the younger royals. If this is the case, that influence and presumably Nefertiti's own life would have ended by year 3 of Tutankhaten's reign (1331 BC). In that year, Tutankhaten changed his name to Tutankhamun. This is evidence of his return to the official worship of Amun, and abandonment of Amarna to return the capital to Thebes.

New theories
In 2012, the discovery of an inscription dated to Year 16, month 3 of Akhet, day 15 of the reign of Akhenaten was announced. It was discovered within Quarry 320 in the largest wadi of the limestone quarry at Dayr Abū Ḥinnis. The five line inscription, written in red ochre, mentions the presence of the "Great Royal Wife, His Beloved, Mistress of the Two Lands, Neferneferuaten Nefertiti". The final line of the inscription refers to ongoing building work being carried out under the authority of the king's scribe Penthu on the Small Aten Temple in Amarna. Van der Perre stresses that:

This means that Nefertiti was alive in the second to last year of Akhenaten's reign, and demonstrates that Akhenaten still ruled alone, with his wife by his side. Therefore, the rule of the female Amarna pharaoh known as Neferneferuaten must be placed between the death of Akhenaten and the accession of Tutankhamun. Neferneferuaten, this female pharaoh, specifically used the epithet 'Effective for her husband' in one of her cartouches, which means she was either Nefertiti or her daughter Meritaten (who was married to king Smenkhkare).

Burial

Nefertiti's burial was intended to be made within the Royal Tomb as laid out in the Boundary Stelae. It is possible that the unfinished annex of the Royal Tomb was intended for her use. However, given that Akhenaten appears to have predeceased her it is highly unlikely she was ever buried there. One shabti is known to have been made for her. The unfinished Tomb 29, which would have been of very similar dimensions to the Royal Tomb had it been finished, is the most likely candidate for a tomb begun for Nefertiti's exclusive use. Given that it lacks a burial chamber, she was not interred there either.

In 2015, English archaeologist Nicholas Reeves announced that high resolution scans revealed voids behind the walls of Tutankhamun's tomb which he proposed to be the burial chamber of Nefertiti, but subsequent radar scans showed that there are no hidden chambers.

In 1898, French archeologist Victor Loret found two female mummies among those cached inside the tomb of Amenhotep II in KV35 in the Valley of the Kings. These two mummies, known as 'The Elder Lady' and 'The Younger Lady', were identified as likely candidates of her remains.

An article in KMT magazine in 2001 suggested that the Elder Lady might be Nefertiti. However, it was subsequently shown that the 'Elder Lady' is in fact Tiye, mother of Akhenaten. A lock of hair found in a coffinette bearing an inscription naming Queen Tiye proved a near perfect match to the hair of the 'Elder Lady'. DNA analysis confirmed that she was the daughter of Tiye's parents Yuya and Thuya.

On 9 June 2003 archaeologist Joann Fletcher, a specialist in ancient hair from the University of York in England, announced that Nefertiti's mummy may have been the Younger Lady. This theory was criticised by Zahi Hawass and several other Egyptologists. In a subsequent research project led by Hawass, the mummy was put through CT scan analysis and DNA analysis. Researchers concluded that she is Tutankhamun's biological mother, an unnamed daughter of Amenhotep III and Tiye, not Nefertiti.

KV21B mummy

One of the two female mummies found in KV21 has been suggested as the body of Nefertiti. DNA analysis did not yield enough data to make a definitive identification but confirmed she was a member of the Eighteenth Dynasty royal line. CT-scanning revealed she was about 45 at the time of her death; her left arm had been bent over her chest in the 'queenly' pose. The possible identification is based on her association with the mummy tentatively identified as Ankhesenamun. It is suggested that just as a mother and daughter (Tiye and the Younger Lady) were found lying together in KV35, the same was true of these mummies.

Hittite letters
A document was found in the ancient Hittite capital of Hattusa which dates to the Amarna period; the so-called "Deeds" of Suppiluliuma I. The Hittite ruler receives a letter from the Egyptian queen, while being in siege on Karkemish. The letter reads:

This proposal is considered extraordinary as New Kingdom royal women never married foreign royalty. Suppiluliuma I was understandably surprised and exclaimed to his courtiers:

Understandably, he was wary, and had an envoy investigate the situation, but by so doing, he missed his chance to bring Egypt into his empire. He eventually did send one of his sons, Zannanza, but the prince died, perhaps murdered, en route.

The identity of the queen who wrote the letter is uncertain. She is called Dakhamunzu in the Hittite annals, a translation of the Egyptian title Ta hemet nesu (The King's Wife). The possible candidates are Nefertiti, Meritaten, and Ankhesenamun. Ankhesenamun once seemed likely since there were no candidates for the throne on the death of her husband, Tutankhamun, whereas Akhenaten had at least two legitimate successors, but this was based on a 27-year reign for the last 18th Dynasty pharaoh Horemheb who is now accepted to have had a shorter reign of only 14 years. This makes the deceased Egyptian king appear to be Akhenaten instead rather than Tutankhamun. Furthermore, the phrase regarding marriage to 'one of my subjects' (translated by some as 'servants') is possibly either a reference to the Grand Vizier Ay or a secondary member of the Egyptian royal family line. Since Nefertiti was depicted as being as powerful as her husband in official monuments smiting Egypt's enemies, she might be the Dakhamunzu in the Amarna correspondence as Nicholas Reeves believes.

Gallery

Cultural depictions
 Nefertiti was portrayed by Geraldine Chaplin in Nefertiti and Akhenaton (1973), Mexican short film of Raul Araiza.
 Nefertiti was also portrayed by Riann Steele in Doctor Who (2012), in the episode Dinosaurs on a Spaceship.

References

Works cited

External links

 Staatliche Museen zu Berlin: Egyptian Museum and Papyrus Collection 
 C. Nicholas Reeves: The Burial of Nefertiti?
 Habicht M. et al: Who else might be in Pharaoh Tutankhamun's tomb (KV 62, c. 1325 BC)?
 A 3D model of a bust of Nefertiti

 
14th-century BC Egyptian women
Wives of Akhenaten
Ay
Queens consort of the Eighteenth Dynasty of Egypt
Year of birth unknown
Year of death unknown